Andrea Collarini (born 31 January 1992) is an Argentinian–American tennis player.

Collarini had represented Argentina in the early days of his career from 2007 to 2010, until he chose to represent USA from 2010 to 2012 before switching back to represent Argentina.

On the junior circuit, Collarini had a career high ITF junior ranking of 5 achieved in 2009. In 2010, he reached the final of the French Open boys' singles event, finishing runner up to Agustín Velotti.

Collarini has a career high ATP singles ranking of 186 achieved on 9 June 2014. He also has a career high ATP doubles ranking of 221 achieved on 14 September 2015. He has won 15 ITF singles titles and 10 ITF doubles titles. He won his first ATP Challenger title at the 2015 Blu-Express.com Tennis Cup in the doubles event partnering Andrés Molteni.

Junior Grand Slam finals

Singles: 1 (1 runner-up)

Performance timeline

Singles

ATP Challenger and ITF Futures finals

Singles: 32 (17–15)

Doubles: 22 (12–10)

References

External links

Argentine male tennis players
American male tennis players
1992 births
Living people
Tennis people from New York (state)
Sportspeople from Boca Raton, Florida
Naturalized citizens of Argentina
American emigrants to Argentina